L'Herbe à brûler (A Weed for Burning) is a Belgian novel by Conrad Detrez. It is the third volume of his "hallucinated autobiography" trilogy, following Ludo (1974) and Les plumes du coq (The Plumes of the Rooster, 1975). Published in 1978, it was awarded the Prix Renaudot the same year and is Detrez's best-known work. The novel is about a Roman Catholic from Belgium who, after years as a revolutionary in Brazil, returns to Europe and finds it enervated. It was first published in English by Harcourt Brace Jovanovich in 1984, translated by Lydia Davis.

References

Further reading
 

1978 Belgian novels
French-language novels